Harry Simms Hersh (December 25, 1911 – February 11, 1932) was an American labor leader from Springfield, Massachusetts. He was sent by the National Miners Union to Harlan County, Kentucky during the Harlan County War to organize the mine workers there.

On February 10, 1932, Simms was shot near Brush Creek in Knox County, Kentucky by a sheriff's deputy who also worked as a mine guard for the local coal company. Simms died of his wound at Barbourville Hospital the next day. He was memorialized in a ballad, "The Death of Harry Simms" by Aunt Molly Jackson and Jim Garland, and his funeral service at the Bronx Coliseum attracted a crowd of some 20,000 people. The folk singer Pete Seeger popularized "The Death of Harry Simms" after learning it from Jim Garland at the Newport Folk Festival in the 1960s. Tao Rodriguez Seeger has performed a cover version of the song with the Allegro Youth Orchestra.

References

External links
Songs
 The Death of Harry Simms. a song written by his personal friend Jim Garland and Garland's stepsister Aunt Molly Jackson

1911 births
1932 deaths
American communists
Assassinated American activists
People from Springfield, Massachusetts
Jewish American trade unionists
People murdered in Kentucky
Deaths by firearm in Kentucky
20th-century American Jews
Trade unionists from Massachusetts